Anton Viktorovich Kiselyov (born 5 November 1986) is a former Russian professional football player.

Club career
He played six seasons in the Russian Football National League for seven different teams.

References
 
 

1986 births
Sportspeople from Barnaul
Living people
Russian footballers
Association football midfielders
FC Dynamo Barnaul players
FC Kuban Krasnodar players
FC SKA-Khabarovsk players
FC Luch Vladivostok players
FC Baikal Irkutsk players
FC Novokuznetsk players